The Route de France Féminine is a women's cycle race.

First held in 2006, it was rated 2.2 by the UCI for the 2006 and 2007 edition, and 2.1 since. The race was cancelled in 2011, but returned the next year.

With the ending of the Grande Boucle Féminine Internationale after 2009, and the Tour de l'Aude Cycliste Féminin after 2010, the Route de France Féminine became the only major women's stage race held in France. The race ended in 2016. Giorgia Bronzini is the most successful stage winner with 10 stage wins.

Podium

References

External links
 Route de France Internationale Féminine
 La Route de France at cqranking.com
 
 Organisers of women’s Route de France blame UCI for race’s cancellation (www.cyclingweekly.co.uk, 2017)

 
Cycle races in France
Women's road bicycle races
Recurring sporting events established in 2006
2006 establishments in France